Terrorama! (2001) is the first feature film of Dutch director Edwin Brienen. In 2002 Terrorama! won the award for Best film at the Melbourne Underground Film Festival and best leading actress at the Toronto Independent Film Festival (Esther Eva Verkaaik).

Plot
The film tells the story of six mental cases, trying to get rid of society's norms and values by kidnapping Gerard van Dongen, a well-known TV host. During an improvised TV show, the terrorists confront this Van Dongen with their darkest thoughts and emotions, resulting in violent excesses and extreme sexual behaviour.

UK release
Salvation Group bought the UK rights for the film in 2003. A DVD was scheduled for release on August 4, 2003, however was pulled back because of BBFC restrictions.  After the killing of Theo van Gogh, Salvation decided to cut the controversial scene with Van Gogh reading from the Koran. The censored version of the film was set to release on June 11, 2007, but was pulled back again for reasons unknown.

External links 

Terrorama! on Letterboxd

Dutch comedy-drama films
2001 comedy-drama films
2001 films
2000s Dutch-language films